Korg Volca (stylised as volca) is a series of electronic musical instruments and accessories released by the Japanese manufacturer Korg. The various units in the range are noted for their inexpensive price and compact dimensions.

The series bridges both digital and analogue synthesis; synthesizers and drum machines, with many different types of noise generation represented in the 10 models available .

The range was initially launched in 2013 with the Volca Keys, Volca Beats and Volca Bass, all initially at £119.99 each. These models all featured MIDI-in for external control, as do most of the later releases with the exception of the Volca Modular.

 the range includes:-
 Volca Bass - Analogue synthesiser intended for bass sounds
 Volca Beats - Hybrid rhythm machine with analog and digital sound source
 Volca Drum - Digital percussion synthesiser 
 Volca FM - Polyphonic digital synthesizer based around FM synthesis with 6 operators and 3 voices polyphony, and 32 algorithms based on the Yamaha DX7's engine.
 Volca FM 2 (Stylised as FM) - Polyphonic digital synthesizer based around FM synthesis with 6 operators 6 voices polyphony
 Volca Keys - Analogue loop synthesiser
 Volca Kick - Analogue kick generator for kick drums and kick basses
 Volca Modular - Semi-modular analogue synthesiser
 Volca Nubass - Vacuum tube-based analogue synthesiser designed for acid-style bass sounds
 Volca Sample2 - Sample sequencer. (Slightly upgraded replacement for the original Volca Sample).
 Volca Mix - Four channel analogue mixer featuring a built-in speaker

References

External links
 Korg Volca - Product page for Volca range

Korg synthesizers